Encephalartos latifrons is a species of cycad that is native to Eastern Cape province in South Africa at elevations of  200 and 600 meters.

Description
It is an arborescent cycad, with an erect or decumbent stem, up to 4.5 m tall and 30-45 cm in diameter.
The leaves, pinnate, of a bright green color, arranged in a crown at the apex of the trunk, are 1–1,5 m long, supported by a 10-20 cm long petiole, curved downwards; they are composed of numerous pairs of large leathery leaflets, up to 15 cm long, arranged on the rachis with an acute angle, partially overlapping, with the lower margin presenting from 3 to 4 triangular lobes.
It is a dioecious species, with male specimens that have from 1 to 3 sub-cylindrical, sessile cones, about 30–50 cm long and 8–17 cm broad, olive-green in color, and female specimens with 1-3 cylindrical cones, erect, about 50–60 cm long and 23–25 cm wide, olive green in color, with macrosporofilli about 8 cm long.
The seeds are coarsely ovoid, 2.5-3.0 cm long, covered with a dark red flesh.

Habitat and Distribution 
E. latifrons occurs (or, more correctly, used to occur) in scattered groups in the districts of Bathurst and Albany in the Eastern Cape province.  The plants grow on rocky outcrops and hill slopes, usually amongst scrub bush vegetation.  The rainfall ranges from 1000mm to 1250mm per year, on average, and is fairly evenly distributed during the year.  Frost does not occur.  Summers may be hot and fairly dry.  There existed an early report of E. latifrons occurring in the Uitenhage district, but this was almost certainly a mistake, possibly as a result of incorrect labelling.

Conservation  
In August 2014 thirteen Encephalartos latifrons cycads were stolen from Kirstenbosch Botanical Gardens in Cape Town, South Africa. The estimated value of all thirteen was at least R200,000 (US18,675).  The plants were planted over 100 years ago as part of a research and reproduction program of this particular species of Encephalartos that no longer naturally reproduces in the wild. Encephalartos is highly valued as a garden or ornamental plant in many parts of the world and it is thought the plants were stolen to be sold on the black market.

References

External links
 
 

latifrons